The following is a list of radio stations in the Canadian province of Quebec, .

See also 
List of Quebec media
Lists of radio stations in North and Central America

External links
Canadian Communications Foundation History of Radio stations in the Province of Quebec

Quebec
Radio stations